Just Dance 2017 is a 2016 dance video game developed and published by Ubisoft. It was unveiled on June 13, 2016, during its E3 press conference as the eighth main installment of the series, and was released in October 2016 for PlayStation 3, PlayStation 4, Xbox 360, Xbox One, Wii, Wii U, and Microsoft Windows; and on March 3, 2017, for Nintendo Switch. The game was the only title of the series to be released on Microsoft Windows, and was released as a launch title for Nintendo Switch.

Gameplay 

As in previous installments, players must mimic the routine of an on-screen dancer to a chosen song, scoring points based on their accuracy. For input, the game supports either the respective motion controller system for a particular console platform, or a smartphone with the game's companion mobile app. For the PC version, a gamepad and a keyboard can also be used for menu navigation.

The "Dance Party" mode has been renamed to the "Just Dance" mode, players can now have the ability to search for a song using the menu. The "Superstar" rank has been added, in which it's achievable at 11,000 points. A new "Just Dance Machine" mode was added on current-generation console and PC versions, in which players must dance through routines of different styles to help recharge an alien spaceship. Each session contains five routines, with "Cosmic Rounds" popping up randomly. The story of this mode follows two aliens that are dancing on their ship. All of a sudden, their battery is running low. To recharge its battery, the aliens traveled to Earth and abduct human dancers known as "coaches" to recharge its battery by dancing. In the ending, the battery was charged and the aliens leave Earth as they keep dancing. But unfortunately, their battery is running low once again.

Ubisoft confirmed that the Dance Quests, Sweat (workout and playlist modes), Just Dance TV, and World Dance Floor (which has been revamped in the Wii U, Switch, PS4, and Xbox One versions of the game, with new features, such as cross-platform between all versions of the game, besides PC, Beat the Boss, where players would need to get a target amount of stars across one to three song(s) to defeat the boss, Spotlight Players, where players would try to beat a player from the "World Video Challenge" mode to earn a share of the pot of Mojo coins, Happy Hours, which now appear daily instead of weekly, and feature songs from the Just Dance Unlimited service, and Tournaments, where players compete each other for the top combined score across three songs in daily tournaments and eight songs in weekly tournaments, while the same features from Just Dance 2015 was retained in the Wii, PS3, and Xbox 360 versions of the game, in which the said title was continued to be its basis, with the "Community Remix" feature now in a full screen format as akin to the Wii U, Switch, PS4, Xbox One, and PC versions) features would be retained on 2017, as well as the Just Dance Unlimited subscription service for versions of the game on current-generation consoles and PC, with additional content and playlist features. The game's companion app was also updated to become "a hub for players' activities", with photo editing features and Just Dance TV content alongside the app's main purpose as a motion controller. The Wii U exclusive "Party Master" mode was removed.

All online services for the Wii, PS3, and Xbox 360 versions of the game were discontinued on November 19, 2018.

Soundtrack 
The following songs appear on Just Dance 2017:

Note: "In the Hall of the Pixel King" by Dancing Bros. and "Itsy Bitsy Teenie Weenie Yellow Polkadot Bikini" by Brian Hyland covered by The Sunlight Shakers were planned to appear in the game, but they were scrapped for unknown reasons. They were later brought back to Just Dance 2018.

Just Dance Unlimited 
Just Dance Unlimited is a subscription-based service for accessing a streaming library of songs from previous Just Dance games, and new songs that are exclusive to the service. A three-month subscription to Just Dance Unlimited is included as part of a higher-priced version of the game, also known as the "Gold Edition". The PAL version of the game includes three months of Just Dance Unlimited, just like the Gold Edition. All exclusive tracks are also playable on the Unlimited mode of 2016. The 2017 game supports Just Dance Unlimited on eighth-generation consoles, on PC, and on Nintendo Switch. This feature is not available in the Chinese version of the game.

Songs exclusive to Just Dance Unlimited include:

Note: The Alternate routines available via Just Dance Unlimited are tie-ins with various franchises, with "Chiwawa" being a tie-in with Barbie for the movie Barbie: Video Game Hero and "Wake Me Up Before You Go-Go" being a tie-in with The Emoji Movie, which features the Just Dance Now app in a scene.

Reception 
Steve Hannley of Hardcore Gamer thought that although Ubisoft had defied his prediction that Just Dance Unlimited would be the future of the franchise instead of physical releases, they had put a larger effort into the on-disc content of 2017 than 2016 (which he described as being a "last minute afterthought" to introduce Unlimited). The Just Dance Machine mode was considered to be "pointless" due to being a basic concept driven by its presentation, but is "a concept that's never been done before in rhythm games and an example of the innovation the series needs to warrant another physical release". Hannley also praised the higher quality of the game's soundtrack, including more recent hit music, fewer "joke" songs, and surfacing Gigi Rowe's "impressive" debut single "Run the Night". In conclusion, Hannley continued to assert that Ubisoft should focus more on providing more immediate access to recent music rather than requiring players to wait for the next annual physical release, but that Just Dance 2017 was "thankfully a marked improvement over its predecessor."

Awards 
The game won the award for "Favorite Video Game" at the 2017 Kids' Choice Awards, and was nominated for "Best Family/Social Game" at the Titanium Awards.

References

External links 

2016 video games
Dance video games
Fitness games
Just Dance (video game series)
Kinect games
Music video games
Nintendo Network games
Nintendo Switch games
PlayStation 3 games
PlayStation 4 games
PlayStation Move-compatible games
Ubisoft games
Video games developed in France
Wii games
Wii U eShop games
Wii U games
Windows games
Xbox 360 games
Xbox One games
MacOS games